George John Frederick West, Viscount Cantelupe (26 April 1814 – 25 June 1850), was a British politician.

Styled Viscount Cantelupe from birth, he was the eldest son of George Sackville-West, 5th Earl De La Warr, by Lady Elizabeth Sackville, daughter of John Sackville, 3rd Duke of Dorset. He was the elder brother of Major-General Charles Sackville-West, 6th Earl De La Warr, Mortimer Sackville-West, 1st Baron Sackville, Lionel Sackville-West, 2nd Baron Sackville and Elizabeth Russell, Duchess of Bedford. He was educated at Christ Church, Oxford.

Lord Cantelupe served in the Grenadier Guards, reaching the rank of lieutenant. In 1837 he was returned to Parliament for Helston, a seat he held until 1840, and then represented Lewes until 1841. He died unmarried in June 1850, aged 36, predeceasing his father. His younger brother Charles eventually succeeded in the earldom.

References

External links

1814 births
1850 deaths
British courtesy viscounts
Heirs apparent who never acceded
Alumni of Christ Church, Oxford
George
Members of the Parliament of the United Kingdom for Helston
UK MPs 1837–1841
Grenadier Guards officers